Mount Orndorff is a peak (1,520 m) standing 5 nautical miles (9 km) south of Nilsen Peak, at the west side of Massam Glacier, in the Queen Maud Mountains. Named by Advisory Committee on Antarctic Names (US-ACAN) for Lieutenant Commander Howard J. Orndorff, U.S. Navy, a member of the winter party at McMurdo Station in 1963.

Mountains of the Ross Dependency
Dufek Coast